William Mackergo Taylor (1829–1895) was an American Congregational minister

Biography

Career
William Mackergo Taylor was born at Kilmarnock, Ayrshire, Scotland on October 23, 1829. He graduated at the University of Glasgow (1849), and at the divinity hall of the United Presbyterian Church, Edinburgh (1852).

He was pastor of churches in Britain till 1872 (for 17 years one in Liverpool). He entered the United States where he became pastor of the Broadway Tabernacle (Congregational), in New York till 1893 when a paralytic stroke caused his retirement.

Writings
He wrote biographies of Rev. Matthew Dickie (1872) and John Knox (1885) and published numerous volumes of sermons and discourses, of which those of a biographical character on Joseph, Moses, David, Elijah, Daniel, and Paul were very popular. He lectured at Yale in 1876 and at Princeton in 1880. He also published The Scottish Pulpit from the Reformation to the Present Day (1887).

Death
Taylor died in New York City on February 8, 1895, and was buried at Woodlawn Cemetery.

Publications
 The Life of Our Lord in the Words of the Four Evangelists
 David, King of Israel: His Life and its Lessons (1875)
 Peter the Apostle (1877)
 Daniel the Beloved (1878)
 Moses the Law-Giver (1879)
 Joseph the Prime Minister (1886)
 The Scottish Pulpit from the Reformation to the Present Day (1887)
 Elijah the Prophet (1903)

References

External links

 
 

1829 births
1895 deaths
American biographers
American Presbyterians
American theologians
Burials at Woodlawn Cemetery (Bronx, New York)